The Nelipić, also called Nelipac or Nelipčić, were a medieval Croatian noble family from Dalmatian Zagora in Croatia. They were greatly involved in political situations in Dalmatia, and in Bosnia. At their greatest extent during the 14th and 15th century, they ruled areas in inner Croatia from mountain Velebit to Cetina river. They emerged as descendants of the Snačić gentis.

Rise of the Nelipić family's power
The rise of the Nelipić family's power was harmonized with the fall of the Šubić family's influence, with whom the Nelipić family continued to have tense relations and frequent skirmishes with during the 1330s. When George II Šubić died between 1328 and 1330, he was succeeded by his son Mladen III Šubić. Pressure from Ivan Nelipić, including his capture of Ostrovica and various lesser Šubić places, led Mladen III and his uncle Paul II to make peace with the Nelipić family.

Notable members

Nelipac
 Isan Nelipić
 Juraj Nelipić
Ivan Nelipić, Duke of Knin, married Vladislava Kurjaković
Ivan II Nelipić, Duke of Cetina, married Margareta Merini
Konstantin Nelipić
 Nelipac
Ivaniš Nelipić, Duke of Trogir (1393), of Split (1403), married Erzsébet Bebek
 Katarina Nelipić, married Ivan VI Frankopan
 Margarita Nelipić, married Grgur Kurjaković
Jelena Nelipić, Queen of Bosnia

See also

Croatian nobility
List of noble families of Croatia

 List of rulers of Croatia
 History of Croatia

References

 
Nelipic